Sergino is a rural locality (a settlement) in Oktyabrsky District of Khanty-Mansi Autonomous Okrug, Russia, located on the left bank of the Ob River. As of 2008, it had a population of 1,490 people.

Etymology
The name of the settlement is derived from the name Sergi, which is a Mansi form of the Russian name Sergey. At some point in the past, the yurts of a person named Sergi were located in this area; hence the name.

Transportation
Sergino has a railway station on the railway which connects Serov and Priobye. There is a regular but infrequent passenger traffic.

There is a road connecting Sergino to both Priobye and Nyagan with further connections to Ivdel and Khanty-Mansiysk.

The Ob is navigable, but there is no port in Sergino, which is located a bit away from the main stream channel. The closest port is located in Priobye.

References

Notes

Sources

А. К. Матвеев (A.K. Matveyev). "Географические названия Урала. Топонимический словарь". (Geographic Names of the Urals. A Toponymic Dictionary). ИД "Сократ". Екатеринбург, 2008.

Rural localities in Khanty-Mansi Autonomous Okrug